Dale Joseph Bolle (June 12, 1923 – December 12, 2007) was a member of the Wisconsin State Assembly.

Biography
Bolle was born Dale Joseph Bolle on June 12, 1923 in Manitowoc County, Wisconsin. He went on to graduate from Lincoln High School in Manitowoc, Wisconsin. During World War II and the Korean War, Bolle served in the United States Army. He was awarded a Bronze Star with Oak Leaf Cluster for heroism and a Purple Heart during World War II . Afterwards, he was a member of the United States Army Reserve, later retiring with the rank of captain. He owned Bolle Trucking Company for more than 30 years.

Bolle died on December 12, 2007 in Whitelaw, Wisconsin and is buried in New Holstein, Wisconsin. He was married to Ethelyn Junk for 61 years. They had two children.

Political career
Bolle was first elected to the Assembly in 1982. He was a member of the Assembly until 1995, at which time he was succeeded by Frank Lasee. Additionally, Bolle was a member of the Manitowoc County Board from 1970 to 1980. He was a Democrat.

References

1923 births
2007 deaths
20th-century American politicians
Democratic Party members of the Wisconsin State Assembly
Military personnel from Wisconsin
United States Army officers
United States Army personnel of World War II
United States Army personnel of the Korean War
People from Manitowoc County, Wisconsin
United States Army reservists